Renate Sølversen (born 27 October 1989) is a Norwegian politician for the Conservative Party.

She was a member of Stokke municipal council from 2011 to 2016, when Stokke ceased as its own municipality. In 2015, she was elected to Vestfold county council. She served as a deputy representative to the Parliament of Norway from Vestfold during the term 2017–2021.

References

1989 births
Living people
People from Stokke
Vestfold politicians
Conservative Party (Norway) politicians
Deputy members of the Storting
Norwegian women in politics
Women members of the Storting
21st-century Norwegian politicians